The Talk of the Town is an album by saxophonist Houston Person recorded in 1987 and released on the Muse label.

Reception

Allmusic reviewer Scott Yanow noted "This Muse recording differs from many of tenor saxophonist Houston Person's previous ones in that Person is backed by a piano rather than an organ; he sounds inspired by the "new" setting. ... A particularly strong effort by the very consistent tenor great".

Track listing 
 "Only Trust Your Heart" (Benny Carter, Sammy Cahn) − 7:26
 "Everything Happens to Me" (Hoagy Carmichael, Johnny Mercer) − 6:07
 "Almost Like Being in Love" (Frederick Loewe, Alan Jay Lerner) − 6:53
 "It's the Talk of the Town" (Jerry Livingston, Al J. Neiburg, Marty Symes) − 7:25
 "Just for You" (Cecil Bridgewater) − 4:18
 "I'll Never Be Free" (Bennie Benjamin, George David Weiss) − 7:30

Personnel 
Houston Person − tenor saxophone 
Cecil Bridgewater − trumpet
Stan Hope − piano
Buster Williams − bass
Grady Tate − drums
Ralph Dorsey − percussion

References 

Houston Person albums
1987 albums
Muse Records albums
Albums recorded at Van Gelder Studio